Wesley Douglas may refer to:

 Wesley Douglas (footballer), Brazilian footballer
 Wesley Douglas (politician), South African politician